Jonathan Robinson may refer to:

Jonathan Robinson (American politician) (1756–1819), American jurist and politician from the state of Vermont
Jonathan Robinson (Canadian politician) (1894–1948), Canadian provincial politician
Jonathan Robinson (English cricketer) (born 1966), former English cricketer
Jonathan Robinson (Irish cricketer) (born 1982), Irish cricketer
Jonathan Robinson (field hockey), South African field hockey player

See also
Jon Robinson (disambiguation)
John Robinson (disambiguation)